Khumoyun Murtozayev (Uzbek Cyrillic: Хумоюн Муртозаев; born 9 November 1992) is an Uzbekistani footballer who plays as a forward for Bunyodkor.

Career

International
He made his debut for main team, Uzbekistan on 23 February 2020 in a friendly match against Jordan.

''Statistics accurate as of match played 23 February 2020.

References

1992 births
Living people
Uzbekistani footballers
Uzbekistan international footballers
Association football midfielders
FC Bunyodkor players
Uzbekistan Super League players